Transcendental Medication is a 1999 album by Inger Lorre, formerly of The Nymphs. The album includes a duet with Jeff Buckley as well as the song "Yard of Blonde Girls" which Buckley covered on his 1998 posthumous album Sketches for My Sweetheart the Drunk. It also includes "She's Not Your Friend", a shot at Courtney Love, with whom Inger had had a spat played out across Hole's Pretty on the Inside album and a Vanity Fair article.

Track listing
All tracks composed by Inger Lorre; except where indicated

"She's Not Your Friend" - 4:42
"Beautiful Dead" - 2:38
"It Could Happen to You" - 3:28
"Gibby Haynes Is Next" - 5:45
"Haunted Hill" (Lorre, Keith Hartel) - 3:13
"Devil's Priest" - 5:43
"Yard of Blonde Girls" (Lorre, Audrey Clark, Lori Kramer) - 3:14
"Thief Without the Take" - 3:03
"Dusted" - 4:55
"Sweet Release" - 5:33
"7B" - 3:29

Personnel
Inger Lorre - vocals, guitar, piano
Jeff Buckley - vocals, guitar
Keith Hartel, Jay Wasco - guitar, background vocals
Bill Donohue - piano, Hammond B-3 organ, Roland synthesizer, background vocals
D.Smith - bass, guitar
Dave Green - bass, background vocals
Frank Lieberum - drums
Paul Andrew - drums, percussion

Inger Lorre albums
1999 debut albums